Cool Ideas may refer to:

 Bickford Shmeckler's Cool Ideas, 2006 American comedy film 
 Cool Ideas (South Africa), South African internet service provider